Acre, known locally as Akko (ʻAkō) or Akka (ʻAkkā), is a city in the coastal plain region of the Northern District of Israel.

The city occupies a strategic location, sitting in a natural harbour at the extremity of Haifa Bay on the coast of the Mediterranean's Levantine Sea. Aside from coastal trading, it was an important waypoint on the region's coastal road and the road cutting inland along the Jezreel Valley. The first settlement during the Early Bronze Age was abandoned after a few centuries but a large town was established during the Middle Bronze Age. Continuously inhabited since then, it is among the oldest continuously inhabited settlements on Earth. It has, however, been subject to conquest and destruction several times and survived as little more than a large village for centuries at a time. Acre was an important city during the Crusades, and was the site of several battles. It was the last city held by the Crusaders in the Levant before it was captured in 1291.

In particular, Acre is the holiest city of the Baháʼí Faith in Israel and receives many pilgrims of that faith every year. Acre is one of Israel's mixed cities; thirty-two per cent of the city's population is Arab. The mayor is Shimon Lankri, who was re-elected in 2018 with 85% of the vote.

Names
The etymology of the name is unknown, but apparently not Semitic. A folk etymology in Hebrew is that, when the ocean was created, it expanded until it reached Acre and then stopped, giving the city its name (in Hebrew, ad koh means "up to here" and no further).

The Akkadian cuneiform Amarna letters also mention an "Akka" in the mid-14th centuryBC. On its native currency, Acre's name was written . It appears in Assyrian and once in Biblical Hebrew. Other transcriptions of these names include Acco, Accho, Akke, and Ocina.

Acre was known to the Greeks as Ákē, a homonym for Greek word meaning "cure". Greek legend then offered a folk etymology that Hercules had found curative herbs at the site after one of his many fights. This name was Latinized as Ace. Josephus's histories also transcribed the city into Greek as Akre.

The city appears in the Babylonian Talmud with the Jewish Babylonian Aramaic name  Talbush of uncertain etymology.

Under the Diadochi, the Ptolemaic Kingdom renamed the city Ptolemaïs (Ptolemaΐs) and the Seleucid Empire Antioch (Antiókheia) or Antiochenes. As both names were shared by a great many other towns, they were variously distinguished. The Syrians called it  (Antiókheia tôs en Ptolemaΐdi), and the Romans . Others knew it as "Antiochia Ptolemais" (Antiókheia Ptolemaΐs).

Under Claudius, it was also briefly known as Germanicia in Ptolemais (Germaníkeia tôs en Ptolemaΐdi).

During the Crusades, it was officially known as Sainct-Jehan-d'Acre or more simply Acre, after the Knights Hospitaller who had their headquarters there and whose patron saint was Saint John the Baptist. This name remained quite popular in the Christian world until modern times, often translated into the language being used: Saint John of Acre (in English),  (in Spanish),  (in Catalan), etc.

History

Early Bronze
Known as Tel Akko in Hebrew and Tell el-Fukhar in Arabic, its remains date to about 3000BC, during the Early Bronze Age. This farming community endured for only a couple of centuries, after which the site was abandoned, possibly after being inundated by rising seawaters.

Middle Bronze
Acre was resettled as an urban centre during the Middle Bronze Age (–1550BC) and has been continuously inhabited since then.

Late Bronze

In the Amarna Period (c. 1350 BC), there was turmoil in the southern Levant which was part of the Egyptian Empire. The Amarna Archive contains letters concerning the ruler of Acco, see Amarna Letter EA245.

Iron Age
During the Iron Age, Acre was politically and culturally affiliated with Phoenicia. In the biblical Book of Judges, Akko appears in a list of the places which the Israelites were not able to conquer from the Canaanites. It is later described in the territory of the tribe of Asher and, according to Josephus's later account, was reputed to have been ruled by one of Solomon's provincial governors. Around 725BC, Acre joined Sidon and Tyre in a revolt against the Neo-Assyrian emperor Shalmaneser V.

Persian period and classical-Greek antiquity

Strabo refers to the city as once a rendezvous for the Persians in their expeditions against Egypt. According to historians such as Diodurus Siculus and Strabo, King Cambyses II attacked Egypt after massing a huge army on the plains near the city of Acre. In December 2018 archaeologists digging at the site of Tell Keisan in Acre unearthed the remains of a Persian military outpost that might have played a role in the successful 525 BC Achaemenid invasion of Egypt. The Persian-period fortifications at Tell Keisan were later heavily damaged during Alexander's fourth-century BC campaign to drive the Achaemenids out of the Levant.

After Alexander's death, his main generals divided his empire among themselves. At first, the Egyptian Ptolemies held the land around Acre. PtolemyII renamed the city Ptolemais in his own and his father's honour in the 260sBC.

 conquered the town for the Syrian Seleucids in 200BC. In the late 170s or early 160sBC, AntiochusIV founded a Greek colony in the town, which he named Antioch after himself.

About 165BC Judas Maccabeus defeated the Seleucids in several battles in Galilee, and drove them into Ptolemais. About 153BC Alexander Balas, son of Antiochus IV Epiphanes, contesting the Seleucid crown with Demetrius, seized the city, which opened its gates to him. Demetrius offered many bribes to the Maccabees to obtain Jewish support against his rival, including the revenues of Ptolemais for the benefit of the Temple in Jerusalem, but in vain. Jonathan Apphus threw in his lot with Alexander; Alexander and Demetrius met in battle and the latter was killed. In 150BC Jonathan was received by him with great honour in Ptolemais. Some years later, however, Tryphon, an officer of the Seleucid Empire, who had grown suspicious of the Maccabees, enticed Jonathan into Ptolemais and there treacherously took him prisoner.

The city was captured by Alexander Jannaeus (ruled –76BC), Cleopatra (r. 51–30BC) and Tigranes the Great (r. 95–55BC). Here Herod the Great (r. 37–4BC) built a gymnasium.

Roman colony

Around 37 BC, the Romans conquered the Hellenized Phoenician port-city called Akko. It became a colony in southern Roman Phoenicia, called Colonia Claudia Felix Ptolemais Garmanica Stabilis. Ptolemais stayed Roman for nearly seven centuries until 636 AD, when was conquered by the Muslim Arabs. Under Augustus, a gymnasium was built in the city. In 4 BC, the Roman proconsul Publius Quinctilius Varus assembled his army there in order to suppress the revolts that broke out in the region following the death of Herod the Great.

During the rule of the emperor Claudius there was a building drive in Ptolemais and veterans of the legions settled here. The city was one of four colonies (with Berytus, Aelia Capitolina and Caesarea Maritima) created in ancient Levant by Roman emperors for veterans of their Roman legions.

The city was a center of Romanization in the region, but most of the population was made of local Phoenicians and Jews: as a consequence after the Hadrian times the descendants of the initial Roman colonists were no more speaking Latin and were fully assimilated in less than two centuries (however the local society's customs were Roman).

The Christian Acts of the Apostles reports that Luke the Evangelist, Paul the Apostle and their companions spent a day in Ptolemais with the Christian brethren there.

An important Roman colony was established at the city, that greatly increased the control of the region by the Romans in the next century with Roman colonists translated there from Italy. The Romans enlarged the port and the city grew to more than 20000 inhabitants in the second century under emperor Hadrian. Ptolemais greatly flourished for two more centuries.

Byzantine period
After the permanent division of the Roman Empire in 395 AD, Ptolemais was administered by the successor state, the Byzantine Empire. The city started to lose importance and in the seventh century was reduced to a small settlement of less than one thousand inhabitants.

Early Islamic period
Following the defeat of the Byzantine army of Heraclius by the Rashidun army of Khalid ibn al-Walid in the Battle of Yarmouk, and the capitulation of the Christian city of Jerusalem to the Caliph Umar, Acre came under the rule of the Rashidun Caliphate beginning in 638. According to the early Muslim chronicler al-Baladhuri, the actual conquest of Acre was led by Shurahbil ibn Hasana, and it likely surrendered without resistance. The Arab conquest brought a revival to the town of Acre, and it served as the main port of Palestine through the Umayyad and Abbasid Caliphates that followed, and through Crusader rule into the 13th century.

The first Umayyad caliph, Muawiyah I (r. 661–680), regarded the coastal towns of the Levant as strategically important. Thus, he strengthened Acre's fortifications and settled Persians from other parts of Muslim Syria to inhabit the city. From Acre, which became one of the region's most important dockyards along with Tyre, Mu'awiyah launched an attack against Byzantine-held Cyprus. The Byzantines assaulted the coastal cities in 669, prompting Mu'awiyah to assemble and send shipbuilders and carpenters to Acre. The city would continue to serve as the principal naval base of Jund al-Urdunn ("Military District of Jordan") until the reign of Caliph Hisham ibn Abd al-Malik (723–743), who moved the bulk of the shipyards north to Tyre. Nonetheless, Acre remained militarily significant through the early Abbasid period, with Caliph al-Mutawakkil issuing an order to make Acre into a major naval base in 861, equipping the city with battleships and combat troops.

During the 10th century, Acre was still part of Jund al-Urdunn. Local Arab geographer al-Muqaddasi visited Acre during the early Fatimid Caliphate in 985, describing it as a fortified coastal city with a large mosque possessing a substantial olive grove. Fortifications had been previously built by the autonomous Emir Ibn Tulun of Egypt, who annexed the city in the 870s, and provided relative safety for merchant ships arriving at the city's port. When Persian traveller Nasir Khusraw visited Acre in 1047, he noted that the large Jama Masjid was built of marble, located in the centre of the city and just south of it lay the "tomb of the Prophet Salih." This figure indicates that Acre at that time was larger than its current Old City area, most of which was built between the 18th and 19th centuries.

Crusader and Ayyubid period

First Crusader Kingdom of Jerusalem (1104–1187)

After four years, the siege of Acre was successfully completed in 1104, with the city capitulating to the forces of King Baldwin I of Jerusalem following the First Crusade. The Crusaders made the town their chief port in the Kingdom of Jerusalem. On the first Crusade, Fulcher relates his travels with the Crusading armies of King Baldwin, including initially staying over in Acre before the army's advance to Jerusalem. This demonstrates that even from the beginning, Acre was an important link between the Crusaders and their advance into the Levant. Its function was to provide Crusaders with a foothold in the region and access to vibrant trade that made them prosperous, especially giving them access to the Asiatic spice trade. By the 1130s it had a population of around 25,000 and was only matched for size in the Crusader kingdom by the city of Jerusalem. Around 1170 it became the main port of the eastern Mediterranean, and the kingdom of Jerusalem was regarded in the west as enormously wealthy above all because of Acre. According to an English contemporary, it provided more for the Crusader crown than the total revenues of the king of England.

The Andalusian geographer Ibn Jubayr wrote that in 1185 there was still a Muslim community in the city who worshipped in a small mosque.

Ayyubid intermezzo (1187–1191)
Acre, along with Beirut and Sidon, capitulated without a fight to the Ayyubid sultan Saladin in 1187, after his decisive victory at Hattin and the subsequent Muslim capture of Jerusalem.

Second Crusader Kingdom of Jerusalem (1191–1291)

Acre remained in Muslim hands until it was unexpectedly besieged by King Guy of Lusignan—reinforced by Pisan naval and ground forces—in August 1189. The siege was unique in the history of the Crusades since the Frankish besiegers were themselves besieged, by Saladin's troops. It was not captured until July 1191 when the forces of the Third Crusade, led by King Richard I of England and King Philip II of France, came to King Guy's aid. Acre then served as the de facto capital of the remnant Kingdom of Jerusalem in 1192. During the siege, German merchants from Lübeck and Bremen had founded a field hospital, which became the nucleus of the chivalric Teutonic Order. Upon the Sixth Crusade, the city was placed under the administration of the Knights Hospitaller military order. Acre continued to prosper as major commercial hub of the eastern Mediterranean, but also underwent turbulent times due to the bitter infighting among the Crusader factions that occasionally resulted in civil wars.

The old part of the city, where the port and fortified city were located, protrudes from the coastline, exposing both sides of the narrow piece of land to the sea. This could maximize its efficiency as a port, and the narrow entrance to this protrusion served as a natural and easy defense to the city. Both the archaeological record and Crusader texts emphasize Acre's strategic importance—a city in which it was crucial to pass through, control, and, as evidenced by the massive walls, protect.

Acre was the final major stronghold of the Crusader states when much of the Levantine coastline was conquered by Mamluk forces. Acre itself fell to Sultan Al-Ashraf Khalil in 1291.

Mamluk period (1291–1517)
Acre, having been isolated and largely abandoned by Europe, was conquered by Mamluk sultan al-Ashraf Khalil in a bloody siege in 1291. In line with Mamluk policy regarding the coastal cities (to prevent their future utilization by Crusader forces), Acre was entirely destroyed, with the exception of a few religious edifices considered sacred by the Muslims, namely the Nabi Salih tomb and the Ayn Bakar spring. The destruction of the city led to popular Arabic sayings in the region enshrining its past glory.

In 1321 the Syrian geographer Abu'l-Fida wrote that Acre was "a beautiful city" but still in ruins following its capture by the Mamluks. Nonetheless, the "spacious" port was still in use and the city was full of artisans. Throughout the Mamluk era (1260–1517), Acre was succeeded by Safed as the principal city of its province.

Ottoman period

Incorporated into the Ottoman Empire in 1517, it appeared in the census of 1596, located in the Nahiya of Acca of the Liwa of Safad. The population was 81 households and 15 bachelors, all Muslim. They paid a fixed tax-rate of 25% on agricultural products, including wheat, barley, cotton, goats, and beehives, water buffaloes, in addition to occasional revenues and market toll, a total of 20,500 Akçe. Half of the revenue went to a Waqf. English academic Henry Maundrell in 1697 found it a ruin, save for a khan (caravanserai) built and occupied by French merchants for their use, a mosque and a few poor cottages. The khan was named Khan al-Ilfranj after its French founders.

During Ottoman rule, Acre continued to play an important role in the region via smaller autonomous sheikhdoms. Towards the end of the 18th century Acre revived under the rule of Zahir al-Umar, the Arab ruler of the Galilee, who made the city capital of his autonomous sheikhdom. Zahir rebuilt Acre's fortifications, using materials from the city's medieval ruins. He died outside its walls during an offensive against him by the Ottoman state in 1775. His successor, Jazzar Pasha, further fortified its walls when he virtually moved the capital of the Saida Eyelet ("Province of Sidon") to Acre where he resided. Jazzar's improvements were accomplished through heavy imposts secured for himself all the benefits derived from his improvements. About 1780, Jazzar peremptorily banished the French trading colony, in spite of protests from the French government, and refused to receive a consul. Both Zahir and Jazzar undertook ambitious architectural projects in the city, building several caravanserais, mosques, public baths and other structures. Some of the notable works included the Al-Jazzar Mosque, which was built out of stones from the ancient ruins of Caesarea and Atlit and the Khan al-Umdan, both built on Jazzar's orders.

In 1799 Napoleon, in pursuance of his scheme for raising a Syrian rebellion against Turkish domination, appeared before Acre, but after a siege of two months (March–May) was repulsed by the Turks, aided by Sir Sidney Smith and a force of British sailors. Having lost his siege cannons to Smith, Napoleon attempted to lay siege to the walled city defended by Ottoman troops on 20 March 1799, using only his infantry and small-calibre cannons, a strategy which failed, leading to his retreat two months later on 21 May.

Jazzar was succeeded on his death by his mamluk, Sulayman Pasha al-Adil, under whose milder rule the town advanced in prosperity till his death in 1819. After his death, Haim Farhi, who was his adviser, paid a huge sum in bribes to assure that Abdullah Pasha (son of Ali Pasha, the deputy of Sulayman Pasha), whom he had known from youth, will be appointed as ruler—which didn't stop the new ruler from assassinating Farhi. Abdullah Pasha ruled Acre until 1831, when Ibrahim Pasha besieged and reduced the town and destroyed its buildings. During the Oriental Crisis of 1840 it was bombarded on 4 November 1840 by the allied British, Austrian and French squadrons, and in the following year restored to Turkish rule. It regained some of its former prosperity after linking with the Hejaz Railway by a branch line from Haifa in 1913. It was the capital of the Acre Sanjak in the Beirut Vilayet until the British captured the city on 23 September 1918 during World War I.

Mandatory Palestine

At the beginning of the Mandate period, in the 1922 census of Palestine, Acre had 6,420 residents: 4,883 of whom were Muslim; 1,344 Christian; 102 Baháʼí; 78 Jewish and 13 Druze. The 1931 census counted 7,897 people in Acre, 6,076 Muslims, 1,523 Christians, 237 Jews, 51 Baháʼí and 10 Druse. In the 1945 census Acre's population numbered 12,360; 9,890 Muslims, 2,330 Christians, 50 Jews and 90 classified as "other".

Acre's fort was converted into a jail, where members of the Jewish underground were held during their struggle against the Mandate authorities, among them Ze'ev Jabotinsky, Shlomo Ben-Yosef, and Dov Gruner. Gruner and Ben-Yosef were executed there. Other Jewish inmates were freed by members of the Irgun, who broke into the jail on 4 May 1947 and succeeded in releasing Jewish underground movement activists. Over 200 Arab inmates also escaped.

1948 Palestine War
In the 1947 United Nations Partition Plan for Palestine, Acre was designated part of a future Arab state. On 18 March 4 technicians from the Palestine Electric Company and five British soldiers in their escort were killed while travelling to mend a cable in an RAF camp, when an Arab ambush exploded a mine on the route just outside the Moslem cemetery east of Acre  The Haganah responded by blowing up a bridge outside the city and derailing a train.  Before the 1948 Arab-Israeli War broke out, the Carmeli Brigade's 21 Battalion commander had repeatedly damaged the Al-Kabri aqueduct that furnished Acre with water, and when Arab repairs managed to restore water supply, then resorted to pouring flasks of typhoid and perhaps diphtheria bacteria into the aqueduct, mas part of a biological warfare programme. At some time in late April or early May 1948, - Jewish forces had cut the town's electricity supply responsible for pumping water - a typhoid epidemic broke out. Israeli officials later credited the facility with which they conquered the town in part to the effects of the demoralization induced by the epidemic.

Israel's Carmeli forces attacked on May 16th and, after an ultimatum was delivered that, unless the inhabitants surrendered, 'we will destroy you to the last man and utterly,' the town notables signed an instrument of surrender on the night between 17-18 May 1948. 60 bodies were found and about three-quarters of the Arab population of the city (13,510 of 17,395) were displaced.

Israel 

Throughout the 1950s, many Jewish neighbourhoods were established at the northern and eastern parts of the city, as it became a development town, designated to absorb numerous Jewish immigrants, largely Jews from Morocco. The old city of Akko remained largely Arab Muslim (including several Bedouin families), with an Arab Christian neighbourhood in close proximity. The city also attracted worshippers of the Baháʼí Faith, some of whom became permanent residents in the city, where the Baháʼí Mansion of Bahjí is located. Acre has also served as a base for important events in Baháʼí history, including being the birthplace of Shoghi Effendi, and the short-lived schism between Baháʼís initiated by the attacks by Mírzá Muhammad ʻAlí against ʻAbdu'l-Bahá. Baháʼís have since commemorated various events that have occurred in the city, including the imprisonment of Baháʼu'lláh.

In the 1990s, the city absorbed thousands of Jews who immigrated from the former Soviet Union. Within several years, however, the population balance between Jews and Arabs shifted backwards, as northern neighbourhoods were abandoned by many of its Jewish residents in favour of new housing projects in nearby Nahariya, while many Muslim Arabs moved in (largely coming from nearby Arab villages). Nevertheless, the city still has a clear Jewish majority; in 2011, the population of 46,000 included 30,000 Jews and 14,000 Arabs.

Ethnic tensions erupted in the city on 8 October 2008 after an Arab citizen drove through a predominantly Jewish neighbourhood during Yom Kippur, leading to five days of violence between Arabs and Jews.

In 2009, the population of Acre reached 46,300. In 2018 Shimon Lankri, was re-elected mayor with 85% of the vote.

Demography
Today there are roughly 48,000 people who live in Acre. Among Israeli cities, Acre has a relatively high proportion of non-Jewish residents, with 32% of the population being Arab. In 2000, 95% of the residents in the Old City were Arab. Only about 15% percent of the current Arab population in the city descends from families who lived there before 1948.

Acre is home to Jews, Muslims, Christians, Druze, and Baháʼís. In particular, Acre is the holiest city of the Baháʼí Faith and receives many pilgrims of that faith every year.

In 1999, there were 22 schools in Acre with an enrollment of 15,000 children.

Transportation

The Acre central bus station, served by Egged and Nateev Express, offers intra-city and inter-city bus routes to destinations all over Israel. Nateev Express is currently contracted to provide the intra-city bus routes within Acre. The city is also served by the Acre Railway Station, which is on the main Coastal railway line to Nahariya, with southerly trains to Beersheba and Modi'in-Maccabim-Re'ut.

Education and culture

The Sir Charles Clore Jewish-Arab Community Centre in the Kiryat Wolfson neighbourhood runs youth clubs and programs for Jewish and Arab children. In 1990, Mohammed Faheli, an Arab resident of Acre, founded the Acre Jewish-Arab association, which originally operated out of two bomb shelters. In 1993, Dame Vivien Duffield of the Clore Foundation donated funds for a new building. Among the programs offered is Peace Child Israel, which employs theatre and the arts to teach coexistence. The participants, Jews and Arabs, spend two months studying conflict resolution and then work together to produce an original theatrical performance that addresses the issues they have explored. Another program is Patriots of Acre, a community responsibility and youth tourism program that teaches children to become ambassadors for their city. In the summer, the centre runs an Arab-Jewish summer camp for 120 disadvantaged children aged 5–11. Some 1,000 children take part in the Acre Centre's youth club and youth programming every week. Adult education programs have been developed for Arab women interested in completing their high school education and acquiring computer skills to prepare for joining the workforce. The centre also offers parenting courses, and music and dance classes.

The Acco Festival of Alternative Israeli Theatre is an annual event that takes place in October, coinciding with the holiday of Sukkot. The festival, inaugurated in 1979, provides a forum for non-conventional theatre, attracting local and overseas theatre companies. Theatre performances by Jewish and Arab producers are staged at indoor and outdoor venues around the city.

Sports

The city's football team, Hapoel Acre F.C., is a member of the Israeli Premier League, the top tier of Israeli football. They play in the Acre Municipal Stadium which was opened in September 2011. At the end of the 2008–2009 season, the club finished in the top five, and was promoted to the top tier for a second time, after an absence of 31 years. 

In the past the city was also home to Maccabi Acre. However, the club was relocated to nearby Kiryat Ata and was renamed Maccabi Ironi Kiryat Ata. 

Other current active clubs are Ahi Acre and the newly formed Maccabi Ironi Acre, both playing in Liga Bet. Both club also host their matches in the Acre Municipal Stadium.

Landmarks

Acre's Old City has been designated by UNESCO as a World Heritage Site. Since the 1990s, large-scale archaeological excavations have been undertaken and efforts are being made to preserve ancient sites. In 2009, renovations were planned for Khan al-Umdan, the "Inn of the Columns," the largest of several Ottoman inns still standing in Acre. It was built near the port at the end of the 18th century by Jazzar Pasha. Merchants who arrived at the port would unload their wares on the first floor and sleep in lodgings on the second floor. In 1906, a clock tower was added over the main entrance marking the 25th anniversary of the reign of the Turkish sultan, Abdul Hamid II.

City walls

In 1750, Zahir al-Umar, the ruler of Acre, utilized the remnants of the Crusader walls as a foundation for his walls. Two gates were set in the wall, the "land gate" in the eastern wall, and the "sea gate" in the southern wall. The walls were reinforced between 1775 and 1799 by Jazzar Pasha and survived Napoleon's siege.

A heavy land defensive wall was built north and east to the city in 1800–1814 by Jazzar Pasha and his Jewish advisor, Haim Farhi. It consists of a modern counter-artillery fortification which includes a thick defensive wall, a dry moat, cannon outposts and three burges (large defensive towers). Since then, no major modifications have taken place. The sea wall, which remains mostly complete, is the original wall built by Zahir that was reinforced by Jazzar Pasha. In 1910, two additional gates were set in the walls, one in the northern wall and one in the north-western corner of the city. In 1912, the Acre lighthouse was built on the south-western corner of the walls.

Al-Jazzar Mosque
Al-Jazzar Mosque was built in 1781. Jazzar Pasha and his successor, Sulayman Pasha al-Adil, are both buried in a small graveyard adjacent to the mosque. In a shrine on the second level of the mosque, a single hair from Muhammad's beard is kept and shown on special ceremonial occasions.

Hamam al-Basha
Built in 1795 by Jazzar Pasha, Acre's Turkish bath has a series of hot rooms and a hexagonal steam room with a marble fountain. It was used by the Irgun as a bridge to break into the citadel's prison. The bathhouse kept functioning until 1950.

Citadel of Acre
The current building which constitutes the citadel of Acre is an Ottoman fortification, built on the foundation of the citadel of the Knights Hospitaller. The citadel was part of the city's defensive formation, reinforcing the northern wall. During the 20th century the citadel was used mainly as Acre Prison and as the site for a gallows. During the Palestinian mandate period, activists of Arab nationalist and the Jewish Zionist movements were held prisoner there; some were executed there.

Hospitaller fortress

Under the citadel and prison of Acre, archaeological excavations revealed a complex of halls, which was built and used by the Knights Hospitaller. This complex was a part of the Hospitallers citadel, which was included in the northern defences of Acre. The complex includes six semi-joined halls, one recently excavated large hall, a dungeon, a refectory (dining room) and remains of a Gothic church.

Other medieval sites
Other medieval European remains include the Church of Saint George and adjacent houses at the Genovese Square (called Kikar ha-Genovezim or Kikar Genoa in Hebrew). There were also residential quarters and marketplaces run by merchants from Pisa and Amalfi in Crusader and medieval Acre.

Baháʼí holy places
There are many Baháʼí holy places in and around Acre. They originate from Baháʼu'lláh's imprisonment in the Citadel during Ottoman Rule. The final years of Baháʼu'lláh's life were spent in the Mansion of Bahjí, just outside Acre, even though he was still formally a prisoner of the Ottoman Empire. Baháʼu'lláh died on 29 May 1892 in Bahjí, and the Shrine of Baháʼu'lláh is the most holy place for Baháʼís — their Qiblih, the location they face when saying their daily prayers. It contains the remains of Baháʼu'lláh and is near the spot where he died in the Mansion of Bahjí. Other Baháʼí sites in Acre are the House of ʻAbbúd (where Baháʼu'lláh and his family resided) and the House of ʻAbdu'lláh Páshá (where later ʻAbdu'l-Bahá resided with his family), and the Garden of Ridván where he spent the end of his life. In 2008, the Baháʼí holy places in Acre and Haifa were added to the UNESCO World Heritage List.

Archaeology

Excavations at Tell Akko began in 1973. In 2012, archaeologists excavating at the foot of the city's southern seawall found a quay and other evidence of a 2,300-year old port. Mooring stones weighing 250–300 kilograms each were unearthed at the edge of a 5-meter long stone platform chiseled in Phoenician-style, thought to be an installation that helped raise military vessels from the water onto the shore.

Crusader period remains

Under the citadel and prison of Acre, archaeological excavations revealed a complex of halls, which was built and used by the Hospitallers Knights. This complex was a part of the Hospitallers' citadel, which was combined in the northern wall of Acre. The complex includes six semi-joined halls, one recently excavated large hall, a dungeon, a refectory (dining hall) and remains of an ancient Gothic church.

Medieval European remains include the Church of Saint George and adjacent houses at the Genovese Square (Kikar ha-Genovezim or Kikar Genoa in Hebrew). There were also residential quarters and marketplaces run by merchants from Pisa and Amalfi in Crusader and medieval Acre.

In March 2017, marine archaeologists from Haifa University announced the discovery of the wreck of a crusader ship with treasure dating back to 1062-1250 AD. Excavators teams also unearthed ceramic bowls and jugs from places as Syria, Cyprus and southern Italy. The researchers thought the golden coins could be used as a bribe to boat owners in hopes of buying their escape. Robert Kool of the IAA identified these 30 coins as florins.

International relations

Acre is twinned with:

Notable people

Joan of Acre (1272–1307), English princess born in Acre
Ghassan Kanafani (1936–1972), Palestinian writer
Raymonda Tawil (born 1940), Palestinian journalist and activist 
Lydia Hatuel-Czuckermann (born 1963), Olympic foil fencer
Ayelet Ohayon (born 1974), Olympic foil fencer
Delila Hatuel (born 1980), Olympic foil fencer
Avigail Alfatov (born 1996), national fencing champion, soldier, and Miss Israel 2014

In popular culture
Acre is one of three main settings in the video game Assassin's Creed.

See also
District of Acre, Mandatory Palestine
Armistice of Saint Jean d'Acre (14 July 1941) between the Allies and Vichy France forces in Syria and Lebanon
Cities of the ancient Near East
Terra Sancta Church

References

Citations

Bibliography

 .

 (23–90, 104–105, 122–124, 149–151)

 (pp. 16 -17)

External links

Acre Municipality official website
Official website of the Old City of Acre
Survey of Western Palestine, Map 3: IAA, Wikimedia commons 
Orit Soffer and Yotam Carmel,Hamam al-Pasha: The implementation of urgent ("first aid") conservation and restoration measures, Israel Antiquities Site – Conservation Department
Picart map of Old Acre, 16th century. Eran Laor Cartographich Collection, The National Library of Israel.

 
Arab Christian communities in Israel
Baha'i holy cities
Castles and fortifications of the Knights Hospitaller
Cities in Northern District (Israel)
Coloniae (Roman)
Hebrew Bible cities
Holy cities
Mediterranean port cities and towns in Israel
Mixed Israeli communities
New Testament cities
Phoenician cities
Achaemenid ports
Roman towns and cities in Israel
Talmud places
Ottoman clock towers
Clock towers in Israel